The Fleischbank is a 2,187-metre-high mountain in the Wilder Kaiser range in the Northern Limestone Alps in Austria, east of Kufstein in the Tyrol.

The mountain is one of the well-known climbs in the Northern Limestone Alps. The starting point for many easy to difficult climbing tours is the Stripsenjochhaus belonging to the ÖAV.

External links 
 Climbing routes on the Fleischbank

Mountains of the Alps
Mountains of Tyrol (state)
Kaiser Mountains
Two-thousanders of Austria